Gussie is a shortened version of the given names Augustus, Augusta, Gustave and others. 

Gussie or Gussy may refer to:

People
Edward Augustus Bowles (1865–1954), British horticulturalist, botanist and writer
Gussie Busch (1899–1989), American brewing magnate
Augusta Clark (1932–2013), African-American librarian, lawyer and politician
Gussie Clarke (born 1953), Jamaican reggae music producer
Caroline Augusta "Gussie" Clowry (1845–1897), pen name G. Estabrook, composer and singer
Gussie Davis (1863–1899), African-American songwriter
Gussy Holl (1888–1966), German actress and singer
Gussy or Gussie Moran (1923–2013), American tennis player
Gussie Mueller (1890–1965), American jazz clarinetist
Gussie Nell Davis (1909–1993), American teacher who founded the Kilgore College Rangerettes
Gussie Ryan (born 1966), Irish retired hurler

Fictional characters
Gussie Fink-Nottle, in the Jeeves novels of British comic writer P. G. Wodehouse

See also
 Gussie Telfair, a merchant steamship built in 1862, formerly USS Gertrude
Gus (disambiguation)

English-language masculine given names
Lists of people by nickname